Don Carlos Gereda y de Borbón, Marqués de Almazán (24 January 1947 – 29 August 2017) was a Spanish aristocrat, engineering entrepreneur and philanthropist.

He was the youngest son of Don Nicolás Gereda y Bustamante and his wife, Doña María Luisa de Borbón y Pintó. She was the younger child of Alberto María de Borbón y d'Ast, 2nd Duke of Santa Elena and Grandee of Spain, a male-line descendant of King Charles IV of Spain through Infante Enrique, 1st Duke of Seville (who married morganatically).

He served as 49th Grand Master of the Order of Saint Lazarus (Malta-Paris obedience) from 2008 until his death, as such succeeding the 5th Duke of Seville (Malta obedience) and the 13th Duke of Brissac (Paris obedience).

Early life and background

Carlos was born in Uruguay, where his parents moved after the Spanish Civil War to run the country estate they had inherited.

Through his maternal grandfather, the 2nd Duke of Santa Elena, he is related to the royal Borbón family, being a sixth cousin once removed of King Felipe VI of Spain.

Carlos spent his early childhood in Spain, before being sent to Ladycross Preparatory School in Sussex, England. He then attended Downside School, a Benedictine foundation in Somerset, before reading Industrial Engineering at the Complutense University of Madrid.

On 15 February 1975, he married Doña María de las Nieves Castellano y Barón, 15th Marquesa de Almazán (born 24 September 1947). Her family's hereditary title was created in 1575 by Philip II of Spain.

Career
In 1975, Carlos embarked on a career in business as a commercial development entrepreneur, which provided him opportunities to travel the world from the Far East to South America and Central Europe. He and his wife lived in Buenos Aires from 1979 to 1986, from where she still operates an oil services company.

Carlos was involved in establishing a Museum of Science and Leisure at Málaga, Spain, with the aim of its developing into one of the most important such museums in southern Europe.

Death
Carlos Gereda y de Borbón died at his residence in Madrid, Spain, on 29 August 2017, following a short illness. He was buried two days later in a private family ceremony.

Distinctions 
 49th Grand Master of the Malta-Paris obedience of the Order of Saint Lazarus, invested at the Chapter-General in 2008, elected after swearing the solemn oath in the presence of knights and dames of the order at Manchester Cathedral, United Kingdom.

References

External links
 Guy Sainty: Burke's Orders of Knighthood and Merit (2006)

1947 births
2017 deaths
Uruguayan businesspeople
House of Bourbon (Spain)
People educated at Ladycross School
People educated at Downside School
Complutense University of Madrid alumni
Knights of Malta
Recipients of the Order of Queen Tamara
Recipients of the Order of Isabella the Catholic
Recipients of the Order of Saint Lazarus (statuted 1910)
Grand Masters of the Order of Saint Lazarus (statuted 1910)